William, Bill, or Billy Root may refer to: 
 William Pitt Root, American poet
 William Lucas Root, American information theorist
 Bill Root (ice hockey), Canadian ice hockey player
 Bill Root (bridge), American bridge player
 Billy Root (cricketer), English cricketer 
 Billy Root (saxophonist), American jazz saxophonist